Yosef "Yossi" Banai (April 13, 1932 – May 11, 2006) was an Israeli performer, singer, actor, and dramatist.

Biography
Banai was born in Jerusalem during the Mandate era, and grew up in the neighborhood of the Mahane Yehuda market. He was one of the more prominent members of a family celebrated for producing several famous performers and musicians: his brothers Gavri, Ya'akov and Haim are actors, his son Yuval and nephews Ehud, Uri, Me'ir and Eviatar are musicians and singers (some of whom occasionally act), and his niece Orna is an actress and comedian.

Banai was one of the first members of the IDF's famous troupe of performers, the Nahal troupe. He dropped out of school in sixth grade to join the theatre, studied acting under Fanny Lovitch and eventually joined the company of Habima theatre. Throughout his lifetime he collaborated with most of the active theatre companies in Israel performing in countless productions. He had a particularly close relationship with playwright Nisim Aloni, and starred in the premiers of many of Aloni's plays. Banai also inaugurated famous roles in the plays of Hanoch Levine and Yaakov Shabtai.

Banai himself wrote several cabaret style revues, which he typically performed solo. He also wrote and directed comic sketches for the comedy trio Hagashash Hachiver, one of whose members was his brother, Gavri.

As a singer, he was famous for his personal presentation, smoky voice and penchant for performing French chansons. Some of his revues consisted of renditions of the songs of Jacques Brel and Georges Brassens, which were often translated from French for him by Naomi Shemer. Shemer also wrote several of her own songs for Banai.

He died of cancer in Tel Aviv. He was survived by his wife and three sons (one of whom is Yuval Banai, lead singer of one of Israel's most influential pop rock bands Mashina).

Awards
In 1998, Banai was awarded the Israel Prize for "stage arts – theatre" for his contribution to Israeli theatre.

Filmography

References

External links

See also
List of Israel Prize recipients

1932 births
2006 deaths
Israeli male film actors
20th-century Israeli male singers
Israeli male stage actors
Israel Prize in theatre recipients
Male actors from Jerusalem
Israeli entertainers
Yossi
Deaths from cancer in Israel
Israeli people of Iranian-Jewish descent
People from Jerusalem